Kurshab (established as Pokrovskoye, before 2004: Leninskoye) is a large village in Osh Region of Kyrgyzstan. It is part of the Özgön District. Its population was 20,471 in 2021. It is situated near the river Kurshab, between the cities Osh and Özgön. 

The settlement was established as Pokrovskoye by settlers from majorly Kiev Governorate of Russian Empire in 1893. By 1900s Pokrovskoye amounted to 186 households.

Population

References

Populated places in Osh Region